Love Is Only Feeling is the sixteenth studio album (eighteenth overall) by British singer/songwriter Donovan. It was released in West Germany (RCA PL 28472) in October 1981, in Italy in January 1982 (Bubble Record, BLU 19610) and belatedly in the UK (RCA PL 28472) in 1983.

History
In 1981, Donovan entered the studio to record the second album of his German RCA contract. The resulting album, Love Is Only Feeling, did not see a US release, but was released in the UK in 1983. The title track is a remake of "Someone's Singing" originally released on A Gift from a Flower to a Garden.

Donovan sang Love Is Only Feeling at Festival di Sanremo 1982 with his daughter Astrella.

Track listing
All tracks by Donovan Leitch.

Original album

Side one
"Lady of the Flowers" – 3:10
"Lover O Lover" – 3:53
"The Actor" – 4:05
"Half Moon Bay" – 3:55
"The Hills of Tuscany" – 4:08

Side two
"Lay Down Lassie" – 4:15
"She" – 4:01
"Johnny Tuff" – 4:58
"Love Is Only Feeling" – 3:04
"Marjorie Margerine" – 4:01

Personnel
Donovan – vocals, guitar
Danny Thompson – double bass
John Stevens – drums, percussion
Tony Roberts – clarinet, piccolo flute, oboe, tenor saxophone
Astrella Leitch – vocals on "Love Is Only Feeling"

References

External links
Love Is Only Feeling – Donovan Unofficial Site

Donovan albums
1981 albums
RCA Records albums